Metin Aslan (born 4 March 1978 in Linz) is a professional footballer. He currently plays for Alanyaspor.

Club career
Born in Austria, Aslan made his professional debut with SV Pasching and won the Erste Liga in 2002 to gain promotion to Austria's top league. He then moved to Turkey to play for the second division side Manisaspor, and in 2006, signed with Antalyaspor. Aslan made his debut for Antalyaspor in a match on 6 August 2006 against Çaykur Rizespor, where he came on as a 70th-minute substitute for Levent Kartop.

External links
 Roster - Antalyaspor
 Player stats - Turkish Football Federation
 Profile -  SK VOEST

1978 births
Living people
Austrian people of Turkish descent
Footballers from Linz
Turkish footballers
Austrian footballers
Manisaspor footballers
Antalyaspor footballers
Alanyaspor footballers
Austrian Football Bundesliga players

Association football defenders